Roxane "Roxy" LeBrasse (born 26 August 1983 in Mauritius) is an Australian singer who was placed ninth place on the third season of Australian Idol. In 2009, Lebrasse (as Roxane) reached number 91 on the ARIA Singles Chart with "Sexy".

Australian Idol
LeBrasse placed ninth on the third season of Australian Idol. She was voted out from the show by the viewers on 3 October 2005. She is the centre of a small amount of controversy for being the 13th member of what has previously been the top twelve contestants on the series.

While she was well liked by both the judges and the voting audience, she never managed to get into the top twelve, first losing out to fellow contestant Laura Gissara, and then losing out to Dan Spillane on the Wildcards show. It was after this that the judges on the show decided to increase the number of contestants in the finals to thirteen, enabling her to compete in the finals.

Australian Idol Performances

Sydney Auditions: I Want You Back by The Jackson Five & Saving All My Love For You by Whitney Houston
Theatre Round Day Two: Pleasure & Pain by Divinyls
Top 30 (Group 2): Natural Woman by Aretha Franklin
Wildcards: All By Myself by Celine Dion
Top 13 (Australian Hits): Forever Now by Cold Chisel
Top 11 (60's Hits): You Can't Hurry Love by Diana Ross
Top 10 (Supergroups): We Are The Champions by Queen
Top 9 (Contestant's Choice): The Voice Within by Christina Aguilera – Eliminated

Post-Idol career
After Australian Idol, LeBrasse continued to work within Australia's recording industry with Jimmy Barnes, Guy Sebastian, Roachford and Jade MacRae, as well as releasing original material with The Rockmelons, Ultraphonic, and Jose Che.

On 18 August 2007, Lebrasse released her debut single "Sexy" under Universal Music Australia, which reached number 91 on the ARIA Singles Chart. However, no more releases were seen from her again, bringing the assumption she had been dropped by the label. In early 2010, LeBrasse began and fronted girl group The Starlettes.

Discography

Albums

Singles

References

1983 births
Australian Idol participants
Living people
21st-century Australian women singers